Julie Patricia Hamill (December 13, 1971) is a London-based author and radio presenter. She maintains her own blog site. She presents London’s Rock n Roll Book Club, Hamill Time on Boogaloo Radio and runs Manchester’s Mozarmy Meet.

Early life and career
Hamill spent a significant part of her early life, till she was 18, in Airdrie, North Lanarkshire. Her first employment was the selling and management of creative advertising campaigns for companies including Saatchi & Saatchi, Bartle Bogle Hegarty and Ogilvy. In 2011, Hamill achieved a First Class Honours Degree in Creative Writing.

Writing 
Her book, 15 Minutes With You: Interviews With Smiths/Morrissey Collaborators and Famous Fans (2015), is a compendium of interviews with individuals associated with the singer Morrissey taken over a three-year period. She first saw Morrissey in 1985, when she was 13 years old. She has continued to publish interviews with people closely associated with Morrissey subsequently via her blog site.

In November 2017, Hamill released her second book, Frank – the first novel of a three-book series – which she finished writing in 2012.

In October 2019, Hamill released her third book, Jackie - the second book in the Life and Soul trilogy. The Daily Record described it as “a real love letter” to her home town. Both of her novels are published by a print on demand service, Saron Publishing.

Radio 
In November 2018, Hamill began presenting her own radio show on Boogaloo Radio called Hamill Time.

"Moz Army" 
Hamill founded the "Moz Army" online community, the popularity of which led to an annual "MozArmy Meet" being established by her in 2013.  The Manchester Evening News has described this event as "one of the biggest fan gatherings of its kind in the world."

The Rock and Roll Book Club 
The Rock n Roll Book Club invites authors of music books to talk about and celebrate their work at the Dublin Castle music venue in Camden, London. Each event includes an on-stage interview, book signing and DJ set.

Bibliography 
 Hamill, J. (2015) "15 Minutes With You: Interviews With Smiths/Morrissey Collaborators and Famous Fans", FBS Publishing
 Hamill, J. (2018) "Frank (Life and Soul Book 1)", Saron Publishing
 Hamill, J. (2019) "Jackie (Life and Soul Book 2)", Saron Publishing

References

1971 births
Living people
21st-century British women writers
Women writers about music
Place of birth missing (living people)